Cristhian Lagos Navarro (born 17 August 1984) is a Costa Rican footballer for A.D. Carmelita.

Club career

Early years
Born in Puntarenas Province, Lagos' parents decided to move to Limón where Cristhian went to school and worked in banana plantations. Only at 22 years of age he was offered the possibility to join second division side Turrialba. Lagos subsequently started his professional career at Turrialba before moving to Brujas in 2010. He joined Alajuelense on loan in February 2011

Deportivo Saprissa 
On December 14, 2012 Lagos signed with Saprissa. He made his debut in a 2–1 loss against San Carlos. On February 10 Lagos scored his first goal with the club in a 2–2 tie against Puntarenas. In August 2013 he returned to Santos.

Churchill Brothers 
On 27 December 2013 it was announced that Lagos had signed for Churchill Brothers of the I-League. On 11 March 2014, Lagos scored brace in AFC Cup match against Maldives side New Radiant SC in which Churchill Brothers won 3–0.

Back to Costa Rica
In June 2014 he returned to Santos de Guápiles, claiming the Indian side broke his contract by only paying him one month wages. He played for the club until the summer 2019, where he joined A.D.R. Jicaral. In 2020, he returned to his first club, Turrialba.

International career 
A tall striker, Lagos was called for the Costa Rica national team in October for the World Cup Qualifiers
against El Salvador and Guyana but did not appear in either of the two matches. Lagos made his debut in a 1–1 draw against Bolivia on November 14, 2012. Lagos scored his first goal with the national team in a 2–0 victory against Nicaragua  in the Copa Centroamericana.

 Scores and results list Costa Rica's goal tally first.

References 

 Cristian Lagos jugará a préstamo en el Xelajú de Guatemala‚ crhoy.com, 23 December 2015

External links

 
  
 

1984 births
Living people
People from Puntarenas Province
Association football forwards
Costa Rican footballers
Costa Rican expatriate footballers
Costa Rica international footballers
Brujas FC players
L.D. Alajuelense footballers
Santos de Guápiles footballers
Deportivo Saprissa players
Churchill Brothers FC Goa players
C.S. Herediano footballers
Xelajú MC players
A.D.R. Jicaral players
Liga FPD players
I-League players
Liga Nacional de Fútbol de Guatemala players
2013 Copa Centroamericana players
Copa Centroamericana-winning players
Costa Rican expatriate sportspeople in India
Costa Rican expatriate sportspeople in Guatemala
Expatriate footballers in India
Expatriate footballers in Guatemala